Aaron Green (May 4, 1917 – June 5, 2001) was an American architect and protégé of Frank Lloyd Wright.

History 
Aaron Green (born May 4, 1917 in Corinth, Mississippi, died June 5, 2001) grew up in Florence, Alabama.  He studied as an architect at Cooper Union in New York City, New York, which is where he was first introduced to the works of Frank Lloyd Wright when he asked the renowned architect to design a house for Stanley Rosenbaum.  Green was invited by Wright to join Taliesin as an apprentice in the early 1940s, from which point the two maintained a close friendship.

Green enlisted in the Air Force during World War II, serving as a bombardier in the Pacific theater.  After the war, he moved to Los Angeles and worked as an interior designer with industrial designer Raymond Loewy.  During this time, he married and began a family.  In 1951, Green moved to San Francisco and founded Aaron G. Green Associates, Inc., an architectural practice dedicated to service-oriented design.  In this organization, Green acted as Wright's West Coast representative.

Green participated in forty of Wright's projects.  At the time of Wright's death in 1959, the Marin County Civic Center was uncompleted, and Green saw the project through to completion  In 1968, he became a member of the College of Fellows, American Institute of Architects.  He taught as a lecturer and critic at Stanford University's department of architecture for fifteen years.  In 2001, he became the first recipient of the Frank Lloyd Wright Foundation's Gold Medal.

Projects 

Public Housing Marin City in Marin City, California (1960).
450 Water Street Medical Offices in Santa Cruz, California
 American Hebrew Academy in Greensboro, North Carolina (1999).
 Greenwood Ridge Wine Tasting Room in Philo, California
 Marin County Civic Center in San Rafael, California
 Shopping Center in Santa Clara, California
 Weir Law Office in San Jose, California

External links 
Aaron G. Green Associates, Inc.
SIGNATURE STYLE: Aaron Green, Getting it Wright, Bay Area architect formed his style within the 'organic architecture' of his mentor - March 5th, 2005
A Taliesin Legacy: The Architecture of Frank Lloyd Wright's Apprentices
When Eichler met architect Aaron Green -- a 'lost' Eichler development that broke the design mold

References 

20th-century American architects
1917 births
2001 deaths
People from Corinth, Mississippi
Architects from Mississippi
Cooper Union alumni